Pachysandra  is a genus of five species of evergreen perennials or subshrubs, belonging to the boxwood family Buxaceae. The small uni-sexual blooms are greenish-white and produced in late spring or early summer.

Etymology
Pachysandra is derived from the Ancient Greek word παχύς (pachýs, 'thick') and the New Latin -androus ('of or pertaining to stamens'), and is a reference to the thick stamens.

Species
Pachysandra axillaris - China
Pachysandra coriacea (sometimes classified as Sarcococca coriacea) - India, Nepal, Myanmar
Pachysandra procumbens - Allegheny Pachysandra (southeast United States)
Pachysandra stylosa - China (sometimes treated as a variety of P. axillaris)
Pachysandra terminalis - China, Japan

Cultivation and uses
Pachysandra can grow in deep-shade areas and is thus well-suited and popular as ground cover for shade gardens. The most commonly used species is P. terminalis, the Japanese spurge, which is an aggressively spreading evergreen ground cover. It is very deer-resistant. The form 'Variegata' has leaves attractively variegated green and creamy white, and is slightly less invasive. 'Green Sheen' Pachysandra has extra glossy leaves and slowly spreads. All species in this genus prefer a well-drained soil with a high humus content.

References

External links

Buxaceae
Eudicot genera
Groundcovers